C900 or similar, may refer to:

 준, the Unicode character U+C900 (준), see List of modern Hangul characters in ISO/IEC 2022–compliant national character set standards
 c.900 (circa 900), about the year
 AD 900
 900 BC
 900s (disambiguation), decades and centuries
 Commodore 900 computer
 C900, alternative name for the LG Quantum smartphone

See also

 C90 (disambiguation)